During the 2017–18 season, PSV Eindhoven participated in the Dutch Eredivisie, the KNVB Cup and the UEFA Europa League. They won the Eredivisie by defeating Ajax 3-0 at the Philips Stadion.

Season summary
Several starting players departed the club before the season, including Andrés Guardado, Héctor Moreno, Davy Pröpper and Jetro Willems. The biggest incoming transfer was Hirving Lozano, coming from Mexican club Pachuca. Despite these changes PSV won the Eredivisie title. The league was decided after a 3–0 victory over rivals Ajax.

In the KNVB cup, PSV reached the quarter-finals before being eliminated by Feyenoord. PSV's Europa League campaign was a failure as they were knocked out by Croatian side Osijek in the qualifying rounds: it was the first time in 43 years that PSV failed to qualify for the main tournament of a European competition.

Squad

Friendlies

Competitions

Eredivisie

League table

Results summary

Matches

KNVB Cup

UEFA Europa League

Qualifying rounds

Statistics

Appearances and goals

|-

|}

Disciplinary record

Transfers

Transfers in

Transfers out

Loans in

Loans out

References

PSV Eindhoven seasons
PSV Eindhoven
PSV Eindhoven
Dutch football championship-winning seasons